Rolando Mendoza (born 7 June 1939) is a Nicaraguan athlete. He competed in the men's shot put and the men's discus throw at the 1968 Summer Olympics.

References

1939 births
Living people
Athletes (track and field) at the 1968 Summer Olympics
Nicaraguan male shot putters
Nicaraguan male discus throwers
Olympic athletes of Nicaragua
Place of birth missing (living people)